TCDD Taşımacılık A.Ş. (reporting mark TCDDT) is a government-owned railway company responsible for the operations of most passenger and freight rail in Turkey. The company was formed on 14 June 2016, splitting off from the Turkish State Railways (TCDD) to take over railway operations, while TCDD would continue to administer railway infrastructure. TCDD Taşımacılık officially began operations on 1 January 2017. 

TCDD Taşımacılık operates trains on a network of over  within 59 of the 81 provinces in Turkey.

Organisation

TCDD Taşımacılık is a government-owned company responsible for the operation of passenger and freight railways within Turkey, including logistical centers and train ferries, using infrastructure owned and maintained by the Turkish State Railways.

Passenger Operations

TCDD Taşımacılık operates passenger rail service on most of its network. Passenger trains service most major cities in Turkey, although a few are without train service, such as Bursa and Antalya. TCDD Taşımacılık operates five types of passenger rail on its network:

High-speed (Yüksek Hızlı Tren): TCDD Taşımacılık's premier rail service.
Mainline (Anahat): Standard intercity passenger rail service, between major cities.
Regional (Bölgesel): Regional rail service, connecting major cities to surrounding cities, towns and villages.
Commuter (Banliyö): Commuter rail service within major cities.
International (Uluslararası): International train service to Europe.

High-speed rail

High-speed rail service is TCDD Taşımacılık's premier trains service, currently operating four routes between Istanbul, Ankara, Eskişehir and Konya along the Ankara-Istanbul and Polatlı-Konya high-speed railways. YHT train service is expected to expand further to Sivas by 2019, Afyon by 2020, as well as Bursa and İzmir in the early 2020s.

YHT trains use Ankara station as their main hub, with an exclusive concourse and lounges within the Ankara Tren Garı building, built over the southern platforms at Ankara station. 

High-speed train service began on 13 March 2009, between Ankara and Eskişehir and in its final year before TCDD Taşımacılık took over, YHT trains carried over 5.89 million passengers.

Intercity rail

Intercity rail in Turkey is known as Mainline service. Mainline trains operate between major cities, often as overnight trains, and make limited stops. Mainline trains also operate at greater speeds than regional and commuter trains, when the route permits it. The Capital Express, Anatolian Express and the Republic Express were a few notable mainline trains that ran on the Istanbul to Ankara rail corridor. Once the Ankara-Istanbul high-speed railway was completed in 2014, all mainline train service between the two cities was replaced with high-speed rail service.

Mainline trains are usually equipped with TVS2000 air-conditioned cars, however refurbished Pullman cars are also used on some trains. Overnight mainline trains consist of sleeping and dining cars while some trains also have couchette cars in addition to sleepers.

During the final year before TCDD Taşımacılık took over operations, mainline trains carried over 1.3 million passengers.

Regional rail

Regional rail service connects major cities to neighboring towns and villages as well as other cities. These trains are usually the slowest in the whole TCDD Taşımacılık system, making frequent stops along its route. Some trains, like the Ada Express, however operate at faster speeds similar to mainline trains. All regional rail service operates within their respective districts, using one city as a hub. 

The most frequent regional rail service in Turkey is between Adana and Mersin with 27 daily trains in each direction. The second most frequent route is between İzmir and Torbalı, with 18 daily trains in each direction.

Regional trains can be locomotive-hauled or consist of diesel or electric trainsets (MUs) or even diesel railcars. Locomotive-hauled trains consist of TVS200 or regular Pullman coaches. DM15000 and DM30000 DMUs are standard along many routes, especially south of İzmir. Regional trains lack any on-board services except at-cart catering services on most trains. 

During the final year before TCDD Taşımacılık took over operations, regional trains carried over 13.5 million passengers.

Commuter rail

Commuter rail service is currently provided in Istanbul, Ankara and Gaziantep; with new networks under planning stage in Konya and Afyonkarahisar. The Marmaray network operates between Halkalı in Istanbul province and Gebze in the neighboring Kocaeli province. The tunnel that Marmaray uses to cross Bosphorus is the deepest immersed tube tunnel in the world, and the tunnel is also used by freight trains. There is another commuter rail service between Halkalı and Bahçeşehir (both in Istanbul province), but due to the lack of a signalling system and double tracks, trains only operate once in the morning and once in the evening in each direction.

The Başkentray network in Ankara provides commuter rail service along an east-west axis between Sincan and Kayaş, with Ankara station as a hub. 

All commuter rail service operates on its own right-of-way, similar to some S-Bahn systems in Germany, and are fully integrated with their respective cities' transportation network. The only commuter railway in Turkey not operated by TCDD Taşımacılık is İZBAN, which operates commuter rail on two lines in the İzmir metropolitan area.

International rail 

While TCDD used to operate several international trains to Europe and the Middle-East, most of these trains were cancelled due to the outbreak of war in Syria and Iraq, and the economic crisis in Greece. Currently, TCDD Taşımacılık operates two international trains from Istanbul to Sofia and Bucharest in Bulgaria and Romania respectively. These two routes operate out of Halkalı as a single train and later split in Bulgaria. Once the rehabilitation of the railway east of Halkalı is completed in late 2018, international train service will resume from their former terminus, Sirkeci station. An agreement between Greece and Turkey to revive the Istanbul to Thessaloniki train, cancelled in 2011, was signed in March 2016 but no progress has been made since and it is still unclear whether or not the train will resume service. 

A new international passenger service from Kars to Baku, Azerbaijan, was expected to start June 2018 via the recently completed Baku–Tbilisi–Kars railway. A train such as this would be the first revenue passenger train service from Turkey to the Caucasus.

Due to the volatile situation in Syria and Iraq, all international train service to the middle-east is suspended indefinitely.

Freight operations

From 1980 onwards, rail freight tonne-kilometers transported by the TCDD rose slightly from ~5000million tonne-km in 1980 to ~7000million tonne-km in 1990 and to ~9000million tonne-km in 2000. Approximately 50% of freight moved is minerals or ores, with construction materials increasing to ~10% in 2000 from less than 5% in 1980, food/agricultural products, chemicals/petroleum, and metal sectors each account for between 5 and 10%. International freight accounted for approximately 5% of totals in 2000.

In 2012, 25.7 million ton were transported by rail in Turkey. Two steel companies, Erdemir and Kardemir, top 2 customers of TCDD, had transported 4.5 million ton in 2012, mainly iron ore and coal. 2.1 million tons of rail freight belong to international traffic. Most of international traffic between Turkey and Europe are done via Kapikule and mainly using container trains.

As of 2016, the amount of goods transported by rail is stable (25.8 million ton) with 7.1 million being done with private wagons (domestic only). International transport is also stable since 2013 (1.8 million).

Containers are widely used both in international and domestic transportation. 7.6 million ton is carried in containers. TCDD is supporting transportation by containers. Thus almost all of the private railway companies invested in container wagons, and carrying 20% of all rail freight by their own wagons.

TCDD has plans to strengthen its freight traffic with the construction of 4000 km conventional lines until 2023. That includes new international rail connections to Georgia, Iraq and Iran. This will be complemented with the construction of 18 logistic centers in order to increase the ratio of domestic freight transported by rail.
The company is also planning to increase its international transit traffic (as little as 7000 ton in 2016) by constructing a "iron silk road" that will be connecting Europe and Asia and thus taking share from one of the world's highest freight traffic routes. Marmaray and the YSS bridge are the most important parts of this project which were completed in 2015 and 2016 respectively. Another key project is the Kars–Tbilisi–Baku railway which is planned to be completed in 2016 and start functioning in 2017. Also, plans for another supplying project to Kars-Tbilisi-Baku railway, the Kars-Igdir-Nakhcivan railway has been completed.

Fleet

TCDD Taşımacılık acquired its entire fleet from the Turkish State Railways on 28 December 2016, when the handover between the two organizations was signed. In total, TCDD Taşımacılık possesses 125 electric locomotives, 543 diesel locomotives, 19 high-speed trainsets, 49 EMUs, 64 DMUs, 872 passenger cars and 19,870 freight cars.

Locomotives

Trainsets

Railcars

Passenger cars

See also
 Transport organizations in Turkey
 General Directorate of Highways (Turkey) 
 Turkish State Railways
 TCDD Taşımacılık
 Turkish Airlines
 Transport in Turkey 
 Turkish State Highway System
 High-speed rail in Turkey
 Rail transport in Turkey
 Otoyol

References

External links
 

Turkish State Railways
Transport companies of Turkey
Companies based in Ankara
Railway companies established in 2016
Turkish companies established in 2016